The Getty family of the United States identify with George Franklin Getty and his son Jean Paul Getty as their patriarchs. In the 20th century they were heavily involved in the petroleum industry. The Getty family is of Scots-Irish ancestry from their patrilineal lineage, their ancestors having immigrated to North America from Cullavmor, County Londonderry, Ireland. Several members of the Getty family have lived in England, including Sir Paul Getty who took British citizenship.

George Getty (1855–1930) was a lawyer who became an independent oilman in 1904. He was married with one son, a daughter having died in infancy in a typhoid epidemic in Minneapolis, Minnesota. He lent his son Jean Paul money to invest in oil wells and in 1916, George and Jean Paul incorporated the Getty Oil Company, later to become Getty Oil.

Family members
The family members include:
 George Getty (1855–1930), American lawyer, married Sarah Catherine McPherson Risher (1853–1941) 
 J. Paul Getty (1892–1976), wealthy American industrialist and founder of Getty Oil, married 5 times and had 5 sons. 

1. George Franklin Getty II (1924–1973), by first wife Jeanette Demont (1904–1986). George first married Gloria Gordon in 1951 and they divorced in 1967. George secondly married Jacqueline (Manewal) Riordan in 1971. Three daughters.
From his second wife, Allene Gladys Ashby (1909–1970), he never had children.
2. Jean Ronald Getty (1929–2009), by third wife Adolphine Helmle (1910–2009). Married Karin Seibl in 1964.
 Christopher Ronald Getty (born 1965) married Pia Miller in 1992, four children.
Isabel Getty (born 1993)
3. Sir Paul Getty (1932–2003), (born Eugene Paul Getty, also known as John Paul Getty II), by fourth wife Ann Rork (1908–1988). Married Abigail Harris in 1956 and divorced in 1964, married Talitha Pol in 1966, Pol died 1971, married Victoria Holdsworth in 1994.
John Paul Getty III (1956–2011), (born Eugene Paul Getty, Jr.) son with Abigail Harris. Married Gisela Martine Zacher in 1974.
 Anna Getty (born 1972), daughter of Gisela Zacher, adopted daughter of John Paul Getty III.
 Balthazar Getty (born 1975, as Paul Balthazar Getty), American actor, son of John Paul Getty III, married Rosetta Millington in 2000, four children.
 Cassius Getty (born 2000)
 Grace Getty (born 2001)
 Violet Getty (born 2003)
 June Getty (born 2007)
 Aileen Getty (born 1959), daughter with Abigail Harris. Married Christopher Wilding (son of actors Elizabeth Taylor and Michael Wilding), married Bartolomeo Ruspoli (son of Alessandro Ruspoli, 9th Prince of Cerveteri), two children.
Mark Getty (born 1960, as Mark Harris Getty), founder of Getty Images, son with Abigail Harris. Married Domitilla Harding in 1982, three children.
 Alexander Parsifal Getty, married Tatum Yount in 2012.
 Joseph Anselm Getty, married Sabine Ghanem in 2015, two children.
Ariadne Getty (born 1962), daughter with Abigail Harris. Married Justin Williams.
Nats Getty (born 1992), married Gigi Gorgeous in 2019.
 August Williams (born 1994), fashion designer
 Tara Gabriel Galaxy Gramophone Getty (born 1968), son with Talitha Pol. Married to Jessica Kelly, three children.
4. Gordon Peter Getty (born 1933), by fourth wife Ann Rork. Married Ann Gilbert in 1964, Gilbert died 2020, four children (and three others with Cynthia Beck).
 Gordon Peter Getty, Jr. (born 1965), married Shannon Bavaro in 2016.
 William Paul Getty (born 1970), married Vanessa Jarman in 1999.
Andrew Rork Getty (1967–2015)
 John Gilbert Getty (1968–2020)
 Ivy Love Getty (born 1994), daughter with Alyssa Boothby. Married Tobias Engel in 2021.
5. Timothy Christopher Ware Getty (1946–1958), by fifth wife Louise Dudley Lynch (1913–2017).

References

Bibliography

 Glassman, Bruce; John Paul Getty: Billionaire Oilman, Blackbirch Press, 2001, 
 Pearson, John; Painfully Rich: The Outrageous Fortune and Misfortunes of the Heirs of J. Paul Getty, St. Martin's Press, 1995, 
 Getty's Secret Double Life

 
American families of Scotch-Irish ancestry
Business families of the United States